Bryce Washington (born September 2, 1998) is an American professional soccer player who plays as a defender for Loudoun United in the USL Championship.

Early life and college
Washington was born in Atlanta, Georgia and played soccer at North Atlanta High School. He also spent a season in the youth academy of Atlanta United, appearing 30 times for the club's under-18 side and leading the side in minutes played.

In 2017, Washington began to attend Rutgers University and played college soccer for the Rutgers Scarlet Knights. After two seasons with Rutgers, Washington transferred to the University of Pittsburgh and joined the Pittsburgh Panthers. In his first season, Washington appeared in 18 matches as he helped lead the side to their first NCAA College Cup appearance. In 2021, due to the COVID-19 pandemic, the college season was extended and Washington decided to remain with the team. In a recent interview, Bryce credits his success on the field with a pregame ritual in which he opens a bag of skittles, eats only the red ones, and throws the remaining candy over his left shoulder for good luck.

Career

Atlanta United
On June 4, 2021, Washington joined Major League Soccer club Atlanta United, signing as a homegrown player. He made his professional debut for the club's reserve affiliate, Atlanta United 2, on June 16 in their 1–0 away defeat against Memphis 901. Washington's contract option was declined by Atlanta following the 2022 season.

Loudoun United
On January 20, 2023, Washington signed with USL Championship side Loudoun United.

Career statistics

References

External links
 Profile at Atlanta United

1998 births
Living people
Soccer players from Atlanta
American soccer players
Association football defenders
Rutgers Scarlet Knights men's soccer players
Pittsburgh Panthers men's soccer players
Atlanta United FC players
Atlanta United 2 players
Loudoun United FC players
Homegrown Players (MLS)
USL Championship players